Mesophysa is a genus of small-headed flies endemic to eastern Australia. It has been treated as a synonym of Panops by some authors, and a separate genus by others. Males and females measure 8–10 mm and 9–11 mm, respectively.

Species
 Mesophysa flavipes (Latreille, 1811)
 Mesophysa ilzei Neboiss, 1971
 Mesophysa tenaria Neboiss, 1971
 Mesophysa ultima Neboiss, 1971

References

Acroceridae
Nemestrinoidea genera
Taxa named by Pierre-Justin-Marie Macquart